Michael F. Blenski (September 27, 1862 – March 23, 1932) was a Polish American immigrant, book-keeper, and Democratic politician.  He was a member of the Wisconsin State Assembly, representing the south side of the city of Milwaukee during the 1893 session.

Early life 
Blenski was born in Stargardt in what is now Poland.  At the time of his birth, this was the Province of Prussia in the Kingdom of Prussia.  In 1880, Blenski emigrated to the United States and settled in Milwaukee, Wisconsin.

Career 
After settling in the United States, Blenski worked as a bookkeeper. He also worked in the Wisconsin Land Office and the Mendota Hospital for the Insane. From 1881 to 1888, Blenski served in the Wisconsin National Guard. He also served as  a judge of the Milwaukee Civil Court.

Blenski was a member of the Wisconsin State Assembly from 1893 to 1894. In 1906, he was a candidate for Lieutenant Governor of Wisconsin, losing to William D. Connor. Additionally, he was a delegate to the 1912 Democratic National Convention, where he was a member of the Committee to Notify Vice-Presidential Nominee. He was one of the first members of the Polish-American community in Milwaukee to serve in elected office.

Personal life 
His son, Roman R. Blenski, was a member of the Assembly and of the Wisconsin State Senate. Another son, Michael, Jr., was an unsuccessful candidate for the Assembly in 1938. Blenski died on March 23, 1932, in Milwaukee, Wisconsin in a hospital following surgery.

References

People from Starogard Gdański
People from West Prussia
Politicians from Milwaukee
Businesspeople from Wisconsin
Military personnel from Wisconsin
Wisconsin state court judges
Democratic Party members of the Wisconsin State Assembly
1862 births
1932 deaths
Polish emigrants to the United States